General elections are due to be held in Mozambique in 2024.

Electoral system
The President is elected using the two-round system. The 250 members of the Assembly of the Republic are elected by proportional representation in eleven multi-member constituencies based on the country's provinces and on a first-past-the-post basis from two single-member constituencies representing Mozambican citizens in Africa and Europe. Seats in the multi-member constituencies are allocated using the d'Hondt method, with an electoral threshold of 5%.

References

Mozambique
Elections in Mozambique
2024 in Mozambique